The 2015 Southern District Council election was held on 22 November 2015 to elect all 17 members to the Southern District Council.

Civic Party's legislator Kenneth Chan Ka-lok failed in challenging incumbent Lam Kai-fai in South Horizons East.

Overall election results
Before election:

Change in composition:

References

2015 Hong Kong local elections